Asif Yaqoob (born 11 November 1973) is a Pakistani cricket umpire. He has officiated in Pakistan Super League. He stood in his first Twenty20 International (T20I) match, between Pakistan and Australia on 26 October 2018. He stood in his first One Day International (ODI) match, also between Pakistan and Australia, on 27 March 2019. In January 2020, he was named as one of the sixteen umpires for the 2020 Under-19 Cricket World Cup tournament in South Africa. In December 2020, he was shortlisted as one of the Umpire of the Year for the 2020 PCB Awards. on January 6, 2022 Asif yaqoob was awarded Umpire of the year 2021 by the PCB.

In January 2022, he was named as one of the on-field umpires for the 2022 ICC Under-19 Cricket World Cup in the West Indies.

See also
 List of One Day International cricket umpires
 List of Twenty20 International cricket umpires

References

1973 births
Living people
Pakistani cricket umpires
Pakistani One Day International cricket umpires
Pakistani Twenty20 International cricket umpires